The 1981–82 Santosh Trophy was the 38th edition of the Santosh Trophy, the main State competition for football in India. It was held in Corporation Stadium, Trichur (now Thrissur), Kerala. Bengal beat Railways 2–0 in the final.

Quarter-finals
This is an incomplete list of matches reconstructed from articles about the tournament.

Semi-finals

First leg

Second leg

Final

References 

Santosh Trophy seasons
1981–82 in Indian football